Seebergsee is a lake in the Canton of Berne, Switzerland.

See also
List of mountain lakes of Switzerland

Lakes of Switzerland
Bernese Oberland
Lakes of the canton of Bern